The 2021 Championnat de France FFSA GT - GT4 France season was the twenty-fourth season of the French FFSA GT Championship and the fourth as the French GT4 Cup, a Sports car championship created and organised by the Stephane Ratel Organisation (SRO). The season began on 3 April in Nogaro and ended on 3 October at Paul Ricard.

Calendar

Entry List

Race Results

Bold indicates overall winner.

Championship standings 			

 Scoring system

Championship points were awarded for the first ten positions in each race. Entries were required to complete 75% of the winning car's race distance in order to be classified and earn points. Individual drivers were required to participate for a minimum of 25 minutes in order to earn championship points in any race.

Drivers' championship

Teams' championship

See also			

 2021 GT4 European Series
 2021 ADAC GT4 Germany

References

External links			

 
			

			
GT4 European Series			
French GT4 Cup